Darwinia glaucophylla is a plant in the myrtle family Myrtaceae which grows as a prostrate shrub, sometimes forming extensive mats. It has bluish green leaves and white flowers in small groups which fade to reddish pink as they age. It is only known from about fifteen sites in the Gosford area and is listed as "threatened" in New South Wales legislation.

Description
Flowering occurs from July to November and is followed by fruit which is a tiny capsule containing a single seed  in diameter.

Taxonomy and naming
Darwinia glaucophylla was first formally described in 1962 by Barbara Briggs from a specimen she collected near Kariong and the description was published in Contributions from the New South Wales National Herbarium. The specific epithet (glaucophylla) is derived from the Ancient Greek words glaukos meaning "bluish-green" or "gray" and phyllon meaning "leaf".

Hybrids between this species and D. fascicularis are known, but are easily recognised as they have a more erect habit.

Distribution and habitat
This darwinia grows in heath and open forest in soils derived from sandstone. It is only known from about fifteen sites near Calga, Kariong and Somersby.

Conservation
Darwinia glaucophylla is classified as "threatened" under the New South Wales Biodiversity Conservation Act 2016. The main threats to the species are habitat degradation, inappropriate fire regimes and extension of a nearby sand mine. Some research suggests that the species may benefit from mowing and appropriate use of burning.

References

glaucophylla
Flora of New South Wales
Myrtales of Australia
Plants described in 1962
Taxa named by Barbara G. Briggs